Cheshmeh Bari (also Romanized as Cheshmeh Barī) is a village in Poshtkuh-e Rostam Rural District, Sorna District, Rostam County, Fars Province, Iran. At the 2006 census, its population was 61, in 10 families.

References 

Populated places in Rostam County